Club de Fútbol Figueruelas was a Spanish football team based in Figueruelas, in the autonomous community of Aragon. Founded in 1987 and dissolved in 2008, it held home matches at Estadio San Isidro, with a capacity of 4,500 seats.

Season to season

1 season in Segunda División B
10 seasons in Tercera División

Notable players
 Eduardo Navarro
 Rubén Pérez

References

External links
BDFutbol profile 

Association football clubs established in 1987
Association football clubs disestablished in 2008
Defunct football clubs in Aragon
1987 establishments in Spain
2008 disestablishments in Spain